George Ford (born 24 February 1993) is a water polo player from Australia. He was part of the Australian team at the  2015 World Aquatics Championships, as well as part of the team attending the 2016 Olympics in Rio de Janeiro.

Ford was picked in the water polo Sharks squad to compete in the men's water polo tournament at the 2020 Summer Olympics. Coached by  Elvis Fatović, the team finished joint fourth on points in their pool but their inferior goal average meant they finished fifth overall and out of medal contention. They were able to upset Croatia in a group stage match 11–8. Australia at the 2020 Summer Olympics details the results in depth.

References

External links
 

Australian male water polo players
Living people
Place of birth missing (living people)
1993 births
Water polo players at the 2016 Summer Olympics
Olympic water polo players of Australia
Water polo players at the 2020 Summer Olympics